Soraya Haddad (born September 30, 1984) is an Algerian judoka. She won the bronze medal in the -52 kg weight class at the 2008 Summer Olympics. She was African champion four times: 2004, 2005, 2008 and 2011, and also a bronze medalist in the -48 kg category in the 2005 World Championships in Egypt. She was born in El-Kseur, Algeria.

References

External links
 
 
 
 

 Athlete bio at official Olympics site

1984 births
Living people
Algerian female judoka
Judoka at the 2008 Summer Olympics
Judoka at the 2012 Summer Olympics
Olympic judoka of Algeria
Olympic bronze medalists for Algeria
Olympic medalists in judo
People from El Kseur
Medalists at the 2008 Summer Olympics
Judoka at the 2004 Summer Olympics
African Games gold medalists for Algeria
African Games medalists in judo
African Games bronze medalists for Algeria
Mediterranean Games gold medalists for Algeria
Mediterranean Games medalists in judo
Competitors at the 2011 All-Africa Games
Competitors at the 2007 All-Africa Games
Competitors at the 2005 Mediterranean Games
21st-century Algerian people